The John B. Angier House is a historic house located at 129 High Street in Medford, Massachusetts.

Description and history 
The -story timber-framed house was built in 1842 by Alexander Jackson Davis in a Gothic Revival style, and the property was originally landscaped by Andrew Downing. The owner, John B. Angier, was a prominent local schoolteacher whose pupils included Francis Parkman. The house is a rare Massachusetts example of Gothic Revival styling more commonly found along the Hudson River.

The house was listed on the National Register of Historic Places on April 23, 1975.

See also
National Register of Historic Places listings in Medford, Massachusetts
National Register of Historic Places listings in Middlesex County, Massachusetts

References

Houses on the National Register of Historic Places in Medford, Massachusetts
Houses in Medford, Massachusetts
Houses completed in 1842
Gothic Revival architecture in Massachusetts